Margaret Alexander may refer to:

Margaret Walker (1915–1998) (born as Margaret Alexander), African-American poet and writer
Margaret F. Alexander, British nursing administrator and medical professional 
Margaret Alexander, Countess Alexander of Tunis  (1905–1977), born Lady Margaret Bingham